The 2018–19 UT Martin Skyhawks men's basketball team represented the University of Tennessee at Martin during the 2018–19 NCAA Division I men's basketball season. The Skyhawks, led by third-year head coach Anthony Stewart, played their home games at Skyhawk Arena as members of the Ohio Valley Conference. They finished the season 12–19, 6–12 in OVC play to finish in a four-way tie for seventh place. As the No. 7 seed in the OVC tournament they defeated Eastern Illinois in the first round before losing in the quarterfinals to Jacksonville State.

Previous season 
The Skyhawks finished the 2017–18 season 10–21, 5–13 in OVC play to finish in a three-way tie for ninth place. They failed to qualify for the OVC tournament.

Roster

Schedule and results

|-
!colspan=9 style=| Exhibition

|-
!colspan=9 style=| Non–conference regular season

|-
!colspan=9 style=| Ohio Valley Conference regular season

|-
!colspan=9 style=|Ohio Valley Conference tournament

Source

References

UT Martin Skyhawks men's basketball seasons
Tennessee-Martin
UT Martin
UT Martin